Goodenia cylindrocarpa is a species of flowering plant in the family Goodeniaceae and is endemic to northern Australia. It is an erect annual, herb with spatula-shaped, or lance-shaped to egg-shaped leaves at the base of the plant, and panicles of small yellow flowers.

Description

Taxonomy and naming
Goodenia cylindrocarpa was first formally described in 2002 by David Edward Albrecht in the journal Nuytsia from specimens collected by Peter Latz near Pictorella Swamp in the Northern Territory in 1982. The specific epithet (cylindrocarpa) refers to the cylindrical shape of the fruit.

Distribution and habitat
This goodenia grows in heavy clamp soil in seasonal swamps in scattered locations in the Northern Territory, and may also occur in arid or semi-arid Queensland.

References

cylindrocarpa
Flora of the Northern Territory
Plants described in 2002